Governance is a quarterly journal published by the Structure and Organization of Government Committee (Research Committee 27) of the International Political Science Association. It covers the theoretical and practical discussion of executive politics, public policy, administration, and the organization of the state. According to the Journal Citation Reports, the journal has a 2017 impact factor of 3.833, ranking it 4th out of 169 journals in the category "Political Science" and 3rd out of 47 journals in the category "Public Administration".

The journal's co-editors are Paolo Graziano and Adam Sheingate. The book review editor is Clay G. Wescott.

Editors Emeritus 

  Michael Atkinson, University of Saskatchewan
 Colin Campbell, University of British Columbia
 B. Guy Peters, University of Pittsburgh
 Jon Pierre, University of Gothenburg
 Bert Rockman, Purdue University
 Graham K. Wilson, Boston University
 Michael Barzelay, London School of Economics

See also 
 List of political science journals

References

External links 
 
 Structure and Organization of Government of sikkim Committee

Political science journals
Wiley-Blackwell academic journals
Quarterly journals
Publications established in 1988
English-language journals
Governance